The 2006 Chicago White Sox season was their first since winning the World Series the season before. They finished with a record of 90–72, good enough for third place in the American League Central, six games behind the champion Minnesota Twins.

Offseason 
 November 25, 2005: Jim Thome was traded by the Philadelphia Phillies with cash to the Chicago White Sox for a player to be named later, Aaron Rowand, and Daniel Haigwood (minors). The Chicago White Sox sent Gio González (minors) (December 8, 2005) to the Philadelphia Phillies to complete the trade.
 November 30, 2005: Paul Konerko was signed as a free agent with the Chicago White Sox.
 December 13, 2005: Rob Mackowiak was traded by the Pittsburgh Pirates to the Chicago White Sox for Damaso Marte.
 December 20, 2005: Javier Vázquez was traded by the Arizona Diamondbacks to the Chicago White Sox for Orlando Hernández, Luis Vizcaíno and Chris Young.
 January 19, 2006: Jorge Velandia and Agustín Montero was signed as a free agent with the Chicago White Sox.
 March 8, 2006: Jeff Bajenaru was traded by the Arizona Diamondbacks to the Chicago White Sox for Alex Cintrón.
 March 20, 2006: Joe Borchard was traded to the Seattle Mariners by the Chicago White Sox for Matt Thornton.

Regular season

Season standings

Record vs. opponents

Game log 

|- style="background-color:#bbffbb"
| 1 || April 2 || Indians || 10–4 || McCarthy (1–0) || Cabrera (0–1) || || 2:59 || 38,802 || 1–0 || box
|- style="background-color:#ffbbbb"
| 2 || April 4 || Indians || 2–8 || Westbrook (1–0) || García (0–1) || || 2:35 || 37,591 || 1–1 || box
|- style="background-color:#ffbbbb"
| 3 || April 5 || Indians || 3 – 4  || Graves (1–0) || Cotts (0–1) || || 4:00 || 33,586 || 1–2 || box
|- style="background-color:#ffbbbb"
| 4 || April 7 || @ Royals || 7–11 || Wood (1–0) || Garland (0–1) || || 2:51 || 23,204 || 1–3 || box
|- style="background-color:#ffbbbb"
| 5 || April 8 || @ Royals || 3–4 || Dessens (1–0) || Politte (0–1) || Burgos (1) || 2:47 || 18,031 || 1–4 || box
|- style="background-color:#bbffbb"
| 6 || April 9 || @ Royals || 3–1 || Buehrle (1–0) || Elarton (0–2) || Jenks (1) || 2:17 || 15,094 || 2–4 || box
|- style="background-color:#bbffbb"
| 7 || April 10 || @ Tigers || 5–3 || García (1–1) || Bonderman (1–1) || Jenks (2) || 2:14 || 44,179 || 3–4 || box
|- style="background-color:#bbffbb"
| 8 || April 12 || @ Tigers || 4–3 || Contreras (1–0) || Robertson (1–1) || Jenks (3) || 2:14 || 12,601 || 3–4 || box
|- style="background-color:#bbffbb"
| 9 || April 13 || @ Tigers || 13–9 || Garland (1–1) || Verlander (1–1) || || 3:12 || 14,027 || 5–4 || box
|- style="background-color:#ffbbbb"
| 10 || April 14 || Blue Jays || 7–13 || Walker (1–1) || Vázquez (0–1) || || 3:15 || 31,418 || 5–5 || box
|- style="background-color:#bbffbb"
| 11 || April 15 || Blue Jays || 4–2 || Buehrle (2–0) || Burnett (0–1) || Jenks (4) || 2:10 || 33,247 || 6–5 || box
|- style="background-color:#bbffbb"
| 12 || April 16 || Blue Jays || 6 – 4  || García (2–1) || Towers (0–3) || || 1:36 || 27,337 || 7–5 || box
|- style="background-color:#bbffbb"
| 13 || April 17 || Royals || 9–0 || Contreras (2–0) || Mays (0–2) || || 2:29 || 27,889 || 8–5 || box
|- style="background-color:#bbffbb"
| 14 || April 18 || Royals || 4–1 || Garland (2–1) || Affeldt (0–2) || Jenks (5) || 2:19 || 21,901 || 9–5 || box
|- style="background-color:#bbffbb"
| 15 || April 19 || Royals || 4–0 || Vázquez (1–1) || Elarton (0–4) || Jenks (6) || 2:34 || 25,459 || 10–5 || box
|- style="background-color:#bbffbb"
| 16 || April 21 || Twins || 7–1 || Buehrle (3–0) || Santana (0–3) || || 2:29 || 31,287 || 11–5 || box
|- style="background-color:#bbffbb"
| 17 || April 22 || Twins || 9–2 || García (3–1) || Radke (2–2) || || 3:01 || 38,955 || 12–5 || box
|- style="background-color:#bbffbb"
| 18 || April 23 || Twins || 7–3 || Contreras (1–1) || Silva (1–3) || || 2:24 || 38,102 || 13–5 || box
|- style="background-color:#ffbbbb"
| 19 || April 24 || @ Mariners || 3 – 4  || Mateo (2–0) || McCarthy (1–1) || || 3:07 || 20,390 || 13–6 || box
|- style="background-color:#bbffbb"
| 20 || April 25 || @ Mariners || 13–3 || Vázquez (2–1) || Piñeiro (2–2) || Logan (1) || 2:46 || 20,451 || 14–6 || box
|- style="background-color:#ffbbbb"
| 21 || April 26 || @ Mariners || 1–5 || Washburn (2–3) || Buehrle (3–1) || || 2:12 || 23,848 || 14–7 || box
|- style="background-color:#bbffbb"
| 22 || April 28 || @ Angels || 8–5 || García (4–1) || Weaver (1–3) || || 3:03 || 43,940 || 15–7 || box
|- style="background-color:#bbffbb"
| 23 || April 29 || @ Angels || 2–1 || Contreras (4–0) || Santana (3–2) || Jenks (7) || 2:24 || 40,065 || 16–7 || box
|- style="background-color:#bbffbb"
| 24 || April 30 || @ Angels || 6–5 || Politte (1–1) || Shields (1–2) || Cotts (1) || 2:35 || 44,135 || 17–7 || box

|- style="background-color:#bbffbb"
| 25 || May 1 || @ Indians || 8–6 || Vázquez (3–1) || Lee (2–2) || Jenks (8) || 3:44 || 17,845 || 18–7 || box
|- style="background-color:#ffbbbb"
| 26 || May 2 || @ Indians || 1–7 || Sabathia (1–0) || Buehrle (3–2) || || 2:38 || 22,630 || 18–8 || box
|- style="background-color:#bbffbb"
| 27 || May 3 || Mariners || 6 – 5  || Jenks (1–0) || Woods (1–1) || || 3:16 || 27,569 || 19–8 || box
|- style="background-color:#bbffbb"
| 28 || May 4 || Mariners || 4–1 || Contreras (5–0) || Hernández (1–4) || Jenks (9) || 2:22 || 26,313 || 20–8 || box
|- style="background-color:#ffbbbb"
| 29 || May 5 || Royals || 4–5 || Dessens (2–1) || Jenks (1–1) || Burgos (4) || 2:49 || 33,628 || 20–9 || box
|- style="background-color:#bbffbb"
| 30 || May 6 || Royals || 9–2 || Vázquez (4–1) || Hernández (1–2) || || 2:38 || 38,593 || 21–9 || box
|- style="background-color:#bbffbb"
| 31 || May 7 || Royals || 3–2 || McCarthy (2–1) || Dessens (2–2) || Jenks (10) || 2:36 || 38,870 || 22–9 || box
|- style="background-color:#bbffbb"
| 32 || May 9 || Angels || 9–1 || García (5–1) || Gregg (2–1) || || 2:34 || 36,539 || 23–9 || box
|- style="background-color:#ffbbbb"
| 33 || May 10 || Angels || 5–12 || Santana (3–1) || Haeger (0–1) || Rodríguez (10) || 3:15 || 31,034 || 23–10 || box
|- style="background-color:#bbbbbb"
| – || May 11 || Angels ||colspan=8| Postponed (rain), 
|- style="background-color:#ffbbbb"
| 34 || May 12 || @ Twins || 1–10 || Santana (4–3) || Garland (2–2) || || 2:26 || 30,473 || 23–11 || box
|- style="background-color:#ffbbbb"
| 35 || May 13 || @ Twins || 4–8 || Radke (4–4) || Vázquez (4–2) || || 2:52 || 33,021 || 23–12 || box
|- style="background-color:#bbffbb"
| 36 || May 14 || @ Twins || 9–7 || Buehrle (4–2) || Silva (2–6) || Jenks (11) || 3:01 || 21,796 || 24–12 || box
|- style="background-color:#bbffbb"
| 37 || May 15 || @ Twins || 7–3 || García (6–1) || Baker (1–4) || || 3:04 || 19,413 || 25–12 || box
|- style="background-color:#ffbbbb"
| 38 || May 16 || @ Devil Rays || 7–10 || Kazmir (6–2) || McCarthy (2–2) || Walker (6) || 3:11 || 11,566 || 25–13 || box
|- style="background-color:#bbffbb"
| 39 || May 17 || @ Devil Rays || 5–2 || Garland (3–2) || Lugo (0–2) || Jenks (12) || 2:39 || 11,607 || 26–13 || box
|- style="background-color:#ffbbbb"
| 40 || May 18 || @ Devil Rays || 4–5 || Hendrickson (3–2) || Vázquez (1–1) || Walker (7) || 2:40 || 11,607 || 26–14 || box
|- style="background-color:#bbffbb"
| 41 || May 19 || Cubs || 6–1 || Buehrle (5–2) || Maddux (5–3) || || 2:07 || 39,301 || 27–14 || box
|- style="background-color:#bbffbb"
| 42 || May 20 || Cubs || 7–0 || García (7–1) || Hill (0–4) || || 2:38 || 39,387 || 28–14 || box
|- style="background-color:#ffbbbb"
| 43 || May 21 || Cubs || 4–7 || Zambrano (3–2) || Cotts (0–2) || Dempster (8) || 2:40 || 38,645 || 28–15 || box
|- style="background-color:#bbffbb"
| 44 || May 22 || Athletics || 5 – 4  || Jenks (2–1) || Flores (0–1) || || 3:06 || 39,354 || 29–15 || box
|- style="background-color:#bbffbb"
| 45 || May 23 || Athletics || 9–3 || Vázquez (5–3) || Saarloos (2–2) || || 3:00 || 38,860 || 30–15 || box
|- style="background-color:#bbffbb"
| 46 || May 24 || Athletics || 3–2 || Buehrle (6–2) || Haren (4–4) || Jenks (13) || 2:31 || 38,434 || 31–15 || box
|- style="background-color:#ffbbbb"
| 47 || May 26 || @ Blue Jays || 2–8 || Lilly (5–4) || García (7–2) || || 2:43 || 22,729 || 31–16 || box
|- style="background-color:#ffbbbb"
| 48 || May 27 || @ Blue Jays || 2 – 3  || Schoeneweis (1–0) || Nelson (0–1) || || 3:32 || 30,063 || 31–17 || box
|- style="background-color:#bbffbb"
| 49 || May 28 || @ Blue Jays || 7–5 || Garland (4–2) || Taubenheim (0–2) || Jenks (14) || 2:50 || 35,277 || 32–17 || box
|- style="background-color:#bbffbb"
| 50 || May 29 || @ Indians || 11–0 || Vázquez (6–3) || Lee (3–5) || || 2:48 || 31,803 || 33–17 || box
|- style="background-color:#ffbbbb"
| 51 || May 30 || @ Indians || 3–4 || Sabathia (5–1) || Buehrle (6–3) || Wickman (8) || 2:43 || 20,944 || 33–18 || box
|- style="background-color:#ffbbbb"
| 52 || May 31 || @ Indians || 0–5 || Westbrook (5–3) || García (7–3) || || 2:46 || 21,671 || 33–19 || box

|- style="background-color:#ffbbbb"
| 53 || June 1 || @ Indians || 8–12 || Cabrera (1–1) || Thornton (0–1) || || 3:06 || 20,846 || 33–20 || box
|- style="background-color:#ffbbbb"
| 54 || June 2 || Rangers || 3–4 || Cordero (5–3) || McCarthy (2–3) || Otsuka (10) || 2:54 || 32,802 || 33–21 || box
|- style="background-color:#bbffbb"
| 55 || June 3 || Rangers || 8–6 || Vázquez (7–3) || Padilla (5–4) || Jenks (15) || 3:20 || 38,697 || 34–21 || box
|- style="background-color:#ffbbbb"
| 56 || June 4 || Rangers || 2–10 || Rheinecker (2–0) || Buehrle (6–4) || || 2:26 || 35,915 || 34–22 || box
|- style="background-color:#bbffbb"
| 57 || June 6 || Tigers || 4–3 || McCarthy (3–3) || Rodney (4–2) || Jenks (16) || 2:42 || 37,192 || 35–22 || box
|- style="background-color:#bbffbb"
| 58 || June 7 || Tigers || 4–3 || Contreras (6–0) || Verlander (7–4) || Jenks (17) || 2:31 || 37,612 || 36–22 || box
|- style="background-color:#ffbbbb"
| 59 || June 8 || Tigers || 2–6 || Rogers (8–3) || Garland (4–3) || || 2:29 || 37,354 || 36–23 || box
|- style="background-color:#bbffbb"
| 60 || June 9 || Indians || 5–4 || Thornton (1–1) || Betancourt (0–2) || Jenks (18) || 2:50 || 33,909 || 37–23 || box
|- style="background-color:#bbffbb"
| 61 || June 10 || Indians || 4 – 3  || Montero (1–0) || Wickman (1–1) || || 3:29 || 36,265 || 38–23 || box
|- style="background-color:#ffbbbb"
| 62 || June 11 || Indians || 8–10 || Westbrook (6–3) || García (7–4) || Wickman (9) || 3:13 || 34,410 || 38–24 || box
|- style="background-color:#bbffbb"
| 63 || June 12 || @ Rangers || 8–3 || Contreras (7–0) || Koronka (4–4) || || 2:40 || 29,182 || 39–24 || box
|- style="background-color:#bbffbb"
| 64 || June 13 || @ Rangers || 5–2 || Garland (5–3) || Loe (3–6) || Jenks (19) || 2:43 || 18,354 || 40–24 || box
|- style="background-color:#ffbbbb"
| 65 || June 14 || @ Rangers || 0–8 || Padilla (6–4) || Vázquez (7–4) || || 2:23 || 28,776 || 40–25 || box
|- style="background-color:#bbffbb"
| 66 || June 15 || @ Rangers || 8–2 || Buehrle (7–4) || Rheinecker (2–1) || || 2:35 || 19,424 || 41–25 || box
|- style="background-color:#bbffbb"
| 67 || June 16 || @ Reds || 12–4 || García (8–4) || Claussen (3–8) || || 2:37 || 32,673 || 42–25 || box
|- style="background-color:#bbffbb"
| 68 || June 17 || @ Reds || 8–6 || Thornton (2–1) || Coffey (3–1) || Jenks (20) || 3:09 || 39,451 || 43–25 || box
|- style="background-color:#bbffbb"
| 69 || June 18 || @ Reds || 8–1 || Garland (6–3) || Harang (7–5) || || 2:35 || 31,569 || 44–25 || box
|- style="background-color:#bbffbb"
| 70 || June 20 || Cardinals || 20–6 || Vázquez (8–4) || Mulder (6–5) || || 3:23 || 39,463 || 45–25 || box
|- style="background-color:#bbffbb"
| 71 || June 21 || Cardinals || 13–5 || Buehrle (8–4) || Marquis (9–5) || || 2:20 || 37,897 || 46–25 || box
|- style="background-color:#bbffbb"
| 72 || June 22 || Cardinals || 1–0 || García (9–4) || Reyes (1–1) || Jenks (21) || 2:00 || 39,509 || 47–25 || box
|- style="background-color:#bbffbb"
| 73 || June 23 || Astros || 7–4 || Contreras (8–0) || Pettitte (6–8) || Jenks (22) || 2:50 || 37,700 || 48–25 || box
|- style="background-color:#bbffbb"
| 74 || June 24 || Astros || 6 – 5  || Thornton (3–1) || Wheeler (1–5) || || 3:19 || 38,377 || 49–25 || box
|- style="background-color:#ffbbbb"
| 75 || June 25 || Astros || 9 – 10  || Nieve (3–3) || McCarthy (3–4) || || 4:25 || 38,516 || 49–26 || box
|- style="background-color:#bbffbb"
| 76 || June 27 || @ Pirates || 4–2 || Buehrle (9–4) || Snell (7–5) || Jenks (23) || 2:29 || 24,976 || 50–26 || box
|- style="background-color:#bbffbb"
| 77 || June 28 || @ Pirates || 4–3 || García (10–4) || Maholm (2–7) || Jenks (24) || 2:31 || 23,118 || 51–26 || box
|- style="background-color:#ffbbbb"
| 78 || June 29 || @ Pirates || 6–7 || Gonzalez (2–3) || Politte (1–2) || || 2:46 || 21,380 || 51–27 || box
|- style="background-color:#bbffbb"
| 79 || June 30 || @ Cubs || 6–2 || Garland (7–3) || Marshall (4–7) || || 2:53 || 40,720 || 52–27 || box

|- style="background-color:#bbffbb"
| 80 || July 1 || @ Cubs || 8–6 || Cotts (1–2) || Dempster (1–5) || Jenks (25) || 3:05 || 41,027 || 53–27 || box
|- style="background-color:#ffbbbb"
| 81 || July 2 || @ Cubs || 11–15 || Zambrano (7–3) || Buehrle (9–5) || Howry (2) || 2:53 || 40,919 || 53–28 || box
|- style="background-color:#ffbbbb"
| 82 || July 3 || Orioles || 1–8 || Bédard (9–6) || García (10–5) || || 2:24 || 38,829 || 53–29 || box
|- style="background-color:#bbffbb"
| 83 || July 4 || Orioles || 13–0 || Contreras (9–0) || López (5–10) || || 2:48 || 37,300 || 54–29 || box
|- style="background-color:#bbffbb"
| 84 || July 5 || Orioles || 4–2 || Garland (8–3) || Cabrera (4–6) || Jenks (26) || 2:27 || 38,872 || 55–29 || box
|- style="background-color:#bbffbb"
| 85 || July 6 || Orioles || 11–8 || Vázquez (9–4) || Ortiz (0–1) || Thornton (1) || 3:03 || 35,266 || 56–29 || box
|- style="background-color:#ffbbbb"
| 86 || July 7 || Red Sox || 2–7 || Lester (4–0) || Buehrle (9–6) || || 2:46 || 39,355 || 56–30 || box
|- style="background-color:#ffbbbb"
| 87 || July 8 || Red Sox || 6–9 || Beckett (11–4) || Riske (0–2) || Papelbon (26) || 3:50 || 39,497 || 56–31 || box
|- style="background-color:#bbffbb"
| 88 || July 9 || Red Sox || 6 – 5  || Politte (2–2) || Seánez (2–1) || || 6:19 || 39,335 || 57–31 || box
|- style=""
|colspan=11 style="background-color:#bbcaff" | All-Star Break: AL defeats NL 4–3 at PNC Park
|- style="background-color:#ffbbbb"
| 89 || July 14 || @ Yankees || 5–6 || Farnsworth (3–4) || Contreras (9–1) || Rivera (20) || 2:41 || 55,069 || 57–32 || box
|- style="background-color:#ffbbbb"
| 90 || July 15 || @ Yankees || 3–14 || Mussina (11–3) || Buehrle (9–7) || || 3:00 || 55,019 || 57–33 || box
|- style="background-color:#ffbbbb"
| 91 || July 16 || @ Yankees || 4–6 || Wright (6–5) || García (10–6) || Rivera (21) || 2:59 || 54,781 || 57–34 || box
|- style="background-color:#bbffbb"
| 92 || July 18 || @ Tigers || 7–1 || Garland (9–3) || Robertson (8–6) || || 2:28 || 39,153 || 58–34 || box
|- style="background-color:#ffbbbb"
| 93 || July 19 || @ Tigers || 2–5 || Bonderman (10–4) || Vázquez (9–5) || || 2:36 || 39,693 || 58–35 || box
|- style="background-color:#ffbbbb"
| 94 || July 20 || @ Tigers || 1–2 || Zumaya (5–1) || Contreras (9–2) || Jones (25) || 2:29 || 41,075 || 58–36 || box
|- style="background-color:#ffbbbb"
| 95 || July 21 || Rangers || 3–10 || Mahay (1–1) || Buehrle (9–8) || Bauer (2) || 2:44 || 38,246 || 58–37 || box
|- style="background-color:#ffbbbb"
| 96 || July 22 || Rangers || 1–3 || Cordero (7–4) || Jenks (2–2) || Otsuka (26) || 3:09 || 39,250 || 58–38 || box
|- style="background-color:#bbffbb"
| 97 || July 23 || Rangers || 5–0 || Garland (10–3) || Padilla (10–6) || || 2:10 || 38,312 || 59–38 || box
|- style="background-color:#ffbbbb"
| 98 || July 24 || Twins || 4–7 || Radke (9–7) || Vázquez (9–6) || || 2:54 || 39,750 || 59–39 || box
|- style="background-color:#ffbbbb"
| 99 || July 25 || Twins || 3–4 || Santana (12–5) || Contreras (9–3) || Nathan (20) || 2:37 || 36,984 || 59–40 || box
|- style="background-color:#ffbbbb"
| 100 || July 26 || Twins || 4–7 || Silva (6–9) || Buehrle (9–9) || Nathan (21) || 2:49 || 39,387 || 59–41 || box
|- style="background-color:#bbffbb"
| 101 || July 28 || @ Orioles || 6–4 || Thornton (4–1) || Ray (1–3) || Jenks (27) || 2:56 || 35,382 || 60–41 || box
|- style="background-color:#bbffbb"
| 102 || July 29 || @ Orioles || 13–11 || Garland (11–3) || Johnson (0–1) || Jenks (28) || 3:46 || 34,598 || 61–41 || box
|- style="background-color:#ffbbbb"
| 103 || July 30 || @ Orioles || 7–8 || Rodríguez (1–1) || Jenks (2–3) || || 3:03 || 28,725 || 61–42 || box
|- style="background-color:#bbffbb"
| 104 || July 31 || @ Royals || 8–4 || Contreras (10–3) || Hernández (2–6) || || 2:43 || 12,903 || 62–42 || box

|- style="background-color:#bbffbb"
| 105 || August 1 || @ Royals || 7 – 5  || Riske (1–2) || Burgos (2–4) || Jenks (29) || 3:20 || 11,609 || 63–42 || box
|- style="background-color:#ffbbbb"
| 106 || August 2 || @ Royals || 3–7 || Hudson (4–3) || García (10–7) || || 2:43 || 10,901 || 63–43 || box
|- style="background-color:#bbffbb"
| 107 || August 4 || @ Blue Jays || 6–4 || Garland (12–3) || Halladay (13–3) || Jenks (30) || 2:48 || 30,060 || 64–43 || box
|- style="background-color:#bbffbb"
| 108 || August 5 || @ Blue Jays || 7–1 || Vázquez (10–6) || Rosario (1–2) || || 2:55 || 35,117 || 65–43 || box
|- style="background-color:#ffbbbb"
| 109 || August 6 || @ Blue Jays || 3–7 || Burnett (3–5) || Contreras (10–4) || || 2:38 || 36,453 || 65–44 || box
|- style="background-color:#ffbbbb"
| 110 || August 7 || Angels || 3–6 || Escobar (8–9) || Buehrle (9–10) || Rodríguez (27) || 2:40 || 37,477 || 65–45 || box
|- style="background-color:#bbffbb"
| 111 || August 8 || Yankees || 6–5 || Jenks (3–3) || Proctor (4–3) || || 3:47 || 39,872 || 66–45 || box
|- style="background-color:#ffbbbb"
| 112 || August 9 || Yankees || 6–7 || Johnson (12–9) || Garland (12–4) || Rivera (29) || 3:17 || 39,406 || 66–46 || box
|- style="background-color:#bbffbb"
| 113 || August 10 || Yankees || 5–4 || Vázquez (11–6) || Mussina (13–5) || Jenks (31) || 3:26 || 39,289 || 67–46 || box
|- style="background-color:#bbffbb"
| 114 || August 11 || Tigers || 5–0 || Contreras (11–4) || Verlander (14–5) || || 2:13 || 39,378 || 68–46 || box
|- style="background-color:#bbffbb"
| 115 || August 12 || Tigers || 4–3 || MacDougal (1–0) || Rogers (11–6) || Jenks (32) || 2:25 || 38,873 || 69–46 || box
|- style="background-color:#bbffbb"
| 116 || August 13 || Tigers || 7–3 || García (11–7) || Miner (7–3) || Jenks (33) || 3:01 || 38,931 || 70–46 || box
|- style="background-color:#bbffbb"
| 117 || August 14 || Royals || 12–2 || Garland (13–4) || Redman (7–7) || || 2:37 || 39,938 || 71–46 || box
|- style="background-color:#ffbbbb"
| 118 || August 15 || Royals || 2–4 || Hernández (3–7) || Vázquez (11–7) || Nelson (1) || 2:43 || 35,690 || 71–47 || box
|- style="background-color:#ffbbbb"
| 119 || August 16 || Royals || 4–10 || Bernero (1–0) || Contreras (11–5) || || 2:44 || 36,998 || 71–48 || box
|- style="background-color:#bbffbb"
| 120 || August 17 || Royals || 5–4 || Buehrle (10–10) || Pérez (0–1) || Jenks (34) || 2:43 || 37,839 || 72–48 || box
|- style="background-color:#ffbbbb"
| 121 || August 18 || @ Twins || 3–7 || Neshek (3–0) || García (11–8) || || 2:45 || 43,204 || 72–49 || box
|- style="background-color:#bbffbb"
| 122 || August 19 || @ Twins || 4–1 || Garland (14–4) || Radke (12–9) || Jenks (35) || 2:32 || 46,215 || 73–49 || box
|- style="background-color:#ffbbbb"
| 123 || August 20 || @ Twins || 3–7 || Santana (15–5) || Vázquez (11–8) || || 2:47 || 42,537 || 73–50 || box
|- style="background-color:#ffbbbb"
| 124 || August 21 || @ Tigers || 1–7 || Verlander (15–6) || Contreras (11–6) || || 2:29 || 39,278 || 73–51 || box
|- style="background-color:#ffbbbb"
| 125 || August 22 || @ Tigers || 0–4 || Rogers (13–6) || Buehrle (10–11) || || 2:28 || 39,361 || 73–52 || box
|- style="background-color:#bbffbb"
| 126 || August 23 || @ Tigers || 7–5 || García (12–8) || Miner (7–5) || Jenks (36) || 3:10 || 40,187 || 74–52 || box
|- style="background-color:#bbffbb"
| 127 || August 24 || @ Tigers || 10–0 || Garland (15–4) || Robertson (11–10) || || 2:14 || 41,565 || 75–52 || box
|- style="background-color:#ffbbbb"
| 128 || August 25 || Twins || 4–5 || Crain (3–5) || MacDougal (1–1) || Nathan (27) || 2:59 || 35,931 || 75–53 || box
|- style="background-color:#ffbbbb"
| 129 || August 26 || Twins || 7 – 8  || Eyre (1–0) || Thornton (4–2) || || 3:37 || 38,636 || 75–54 || box
|- style="background-color:#bbffbb"
| 130 || August 27 || Twins || 6–1 || Buehrle (11–11) || Silva (8–12) || || 2:21 || 35,193 || 76–54 || box
|- style="background-color:#bbffbb"
| 131 || August 29 || Devil Rays || 12–9 || García (13–8) || Fossum (6–6) || Jenks (37) || 3:13 || 35,313 || 77–54 || box
|- style="background-color:#bbffbb"
| 132 || August 30 || Devil Rays || 5–4 || Garland (16–4) || Meadows (2–5) || Jenks (38) || 2:50 || 38,874 || 78–54 || box
|- style="background-color:#ffbbbb"
| 133 || August 31 || Devil Rays || 3 – 5  || Lugo (2–2) || McCarthy (3–5) || McClung (3) || 3:06 || 33,178 || 78–55 || box

|- style="background-color:#ffbbbb"
| 134 || September 1 || @ Royals || 5–7 || Hernández (5–8) || Contreras (11–7) || Nelson (5) || 2:58 || 15,501 || 78–56 || box
|- style="background-color:#bbffbb"
| 135 || September 2 || @ Royals || 5–3 || Buehrle (12–11) || Pérez (1–3) || Jenks (39) || 2:35 || 18,028 || 79–56 || box
|- style="background-color:#ffbbbb"
| 136 || September 3 || @ Royals || 7–3 || Redman (9–8) || García (13–9) || || 2:46 || 20,407 || 79–57 || box
|- style="background-color:#ffbbbb"
| 137 || September 4 || @ Red Sox || 2 – 3  || Timlin (6–4) || McCarthy (3–6) || || 3:07 || 36,206 || 79–58 || box
|- style="background-color:#ffbbbb"
| 138 || September 5 || @ Red Sox || 0–1 || Gabbard (1–3) || Vázquez (11–9) || Timlin (4) || 2:13 || 35,912 || 79–59 || box
|- style="background-color:#bbffbb"
| 139 || September 6 || @ Red Sox || 8–1 || Contreras (12–7) || Snyder (4–4) || || 2:47 || 35,923 || 80–59 || box
|- style="background-color:#ffbbbb"
| 140 || September 7 || Indians || 1–9 || Lee (12–10) || Buehrle (12–12) || || 3:01 || 34,671 || 80–60 || box
|- style="background-color:#bbffbb"
| 141 || September 8 || Indians || 7–6 || Thornton (5–2) || Mastny (0–1) || || 3:17 || 37,188 || 81–60 || box
|- style="background-color:#bbffbb"
| 142 || September 9 || Indians || 10–8 || Garland (17–4) || Carmona (1–9) || Thornton (2) || 3:22 || 38,422 || 82–60 || box
|- style="background-color:#ffbbbb"
| 143 || September 10 || Indians || 2–5 || Sabathia (11–9) || McCarthy (3–7) || || 2:51 || 37,723 || 82–61 || box
|- style="background-color:#bbffbb"
| 144 || September 11 || @ Angels || 3–2 || Contreras (13–7) || Lackey (11–10) || Jenks (40) || 2:22 || 39,316 || 83–61 || box
|- style="background-color:#ffbbbb"
| 145 || September 12 || @ Angels || 3 – 4  || Carrasco (5–3) || Jenks (3–4) || || 3:03 || 39,304 || 83–62 || box
|- style="background-color:#bbffbb"
| 146 || September 13 || @ Angels || 9–0 || García (14–9) || Saunders (5–3) || || 2:37 || 37,030 || 84–62 || box
|- style="background-color:#ffbbbb"
| 147 || September 15 || @ Athletics || 2–4 || Loaiza (10–8) || Garland (17–5) || Street (33) || 2:48 || 26,809 || 84–63 || box
|- style="background-color:#ffbbbb"
| 148 || September 16 || @ Athletics || 4–7 || Zito (16–9) || Thornton (5–3) || Street (34) || 2:53 || 32,169 || 84–64 || box
|- style="background-color:#ffbbbb"
| 149 || September 17 || @ Athletics || 4–5 || Blanton (16–11) || Contreras (13–8) || Duchscherer (9) || 2:38 || 28,806 || 84–65 || box
|- style="background-color:#ffbbbb"
| 150 || September 18 || Tigers || 2–8 || Rogers (16–6) || Buehrle (12–13) || || 2:54 || 39,427 || 84–66 || box
|- style="background-color:#bbffbb"
| 151 || September 19 || Tigers || 7–0 || García (15–9) || Verlander (16–9) || || 2:25 || 38,850 || 85–66 || box
|- style="background-color:#ffbbbb"
| 152 || September 20 || Tigers || 2–6 || Bonderman (13–8) || Garland (17–6) || || 2:53 || 38,971 || 85–67 || box
|- style="background-color:#ffbbbb"
| 153 || September 21 || Mariners || 0–9 || Woods (6–3) || Vázquez (11–10) || || 2:37 || 33,976 || 85–68 || box
|- style="background-color:#ffbbbb"
| 154 || September 22 || Mariners || 6–11 || Fruto (2–1) || Contreras (13–9) || || 3:23 || 37,557 || 85–69 || box
|- style="background-color:#bbffbb"
| 155 || September 23 || Mariners || 11–7 || Haeger (1–1) || Piñeiro (8–13) || || 2:31 || 37,400 || 86–69 || box
|- style="background-color:#bbffbb"
| 156 || September 24 || Mariners || 12–7 || García (16–9) || Feierabend (0–1) || || 2:58 || 37,518 || 87–69 || box
|- style="background-color:#ffbbbb"
| 157 || September 25 || @ Indians || 1–14 || Lee (13–11) || Garland (17–7) || || 2:32 || 15,913 || 87–70 || box
|- style="background-color:#ffbbbb"
| 158 || September 26 || @ Indians || 0–6 || Sabathia (12–11) || Vázquez (11–11) || || 2:19 || 16,080 || 87–71 || box
|- style="background-color:#bbffbb"
| 159 || September 27 || @ Indians || 2–1 || McCarthy (4–7) || Carmona (1–10) || Haeger (1) || 2:08 || 16,404 || 88–71 || box
|- style="background-color:#bbffbb"
| 160 || September 29 || @ Twins || 4–3 || García (17–9) || Bonser (7–6) || Jenks (41) || 2:27 || 45,439 || 89–71 || box
|- style="background-color:#bbffbb"
| 161 || September 30 || @ Twins || 6–3 || Garland (18–7) || Garza (3–6) || || 2:34 || 46,219 || 90–71 || box
|- style="background-color:#ffbbbb"
| 162 || October 1 || @ Twins || 1–5 || Silva (11–15) || Vázquez (11–12) || || 2:56 || 45,182 || 90–72 || box

Transactions 
 April 1, 2006: Ernie Young was signed as a free agent with the Chicago White Sox.
 May 2, 2006: Jeff Nelson was signed as a free agent with the Chicago White Sox.
 June 15, 2006: David Riske was traded by the Boston Red Sox to the Chicago White Sox for Javier Lopez.
 July 20, 2006: Cliff Politte was released by the Chicago White Sox.
 July 23, 2006: Sandy Alomar Jr. was traded by the Los Angeles Dodgers to the Chicago White Sox for B. J. LaMura (minors).

Roster

Opening Day lineup 
 Scott Podsednik, LF
 Tadahito Iguchi, 2B
 Jim Thome, DH
 Paul Konerko, 1B
 Jermaine Dye, RF
 A. J. Pierzynski, C
 Joe Crede, 3B
 Juan Uribe, SS
 Brian Anderson, CF
 José Contreras, P

Player stats

Batting 
Note: G = Games played; AB = At bats; R = Runs scored; H = Hits; 2B = Doubles; 3B = Triples; HR = Home runs; RBI = Runs batted in; BB = Base on balls; SO = Strikeouts; AVG = Batting average; SB = Stolen bases

Pitching 
Note: W = Wins; L = Losses; ERA = Earned run average; G = Games pitched; GS = Games started; SV = Saves; IP = Innings pitched; H = Hits allowed; R = Runs allowed; ER = Earned runs allowed; HR = Home runs allowed; BB = Walks allowed; K = Strikeouts

Farm system

References 

 Batting Statistics: Chicago White Sox Batting Stats on ESPN.com
 Pitching Statistics: Chicago White Sox Pitching Stats on ESPN.com

External links 
 2006 Chicago White Sox at Baseball Reference

Chicago White Sox seasons
Chicago White Sox season
Chicago White Sox